Valsøyfjord Church is a parish church of the Church of Norway in Heim Municipality in Trøndelag county, Norway. It is located in the village of Valsøyfjord. It is one of two churches for the Halsa parish which is part of the Orkdal prosti (deanery) in the Diocese of Nidaros. The white, wooden church was built in a long church style in 1864 using plans drawn up by the architect Jacob Wilhelm Nordan. The church seats about 300 people.

Media gallery

See also
List of churches in Nidaros

References

Heim, Norway
Churches in Trøndelag
Wooden churches in Norway
Long churches in Norway
19th-century Church of Norway church buildings
Churches completed in 1864
1864 establishments in Norway